Villa San Secondo is a comune (municipality) in the Province of Asti in the Italian region Piedmont, located about  east of Turin and about  northwest of Asti.

Villa San Secondo borders the following municipalities: Castell'Alfero, Corsione, Cossombrato, Frinco, Montechiaro d'Asti, Montiglio Monferrato, and Tonco.

References

Cities and towns in Piedmont